The 2012 Northwestern State Demons football team represented Northwestern State University as a member of the Southland Conference during the 2012 NCAA Division I FCS football season. Led by Bradley Dale Peveto in his fourth and final season as head coach, the Demons compiled an overall record of 4–7 with a mark of 2–5 in conference play, placing sixth in the Southland. Northwestern State played home games at Harry Turpin Stadium in Natchitoches, Louisiana.

Schedule

Game summaries

Texas Tech
 
Northwestern State opens the season with their second match against the Red Raiders. The previous match was in 2007, and Tech walked away with a 75–7 win.

Sources:

Arkansas–Monticello

Northwestern State heads home for the second game of the year where they play the Boll Weevils for the second time in school history. In the previous meeting in 2006 the Demons won 20–6.  
Sources:

Nevada

Sources:

Mississippi Valley State

Sources:

McNeese State

Sources:

Lamar

Sources:

Southeastern Louisiana

Sources:

Nicholls State

Sources:

Central Arkansas

Sources:

Sam Houston State

Sources:

Stephen F. Austin

Sources:

Media
All games aired on the radio via the Demon Sports Network, found on KNWD and online at nsudemons.com.

References

Northwestern State
Northwestern State Demons football seasons
Northwestern State Demons football